Justin Arop (March 24, 1958 – 1994) was a track and field athlete from Uganda, who competed in the men's javelin throw event during his career. A two-time winner at the All-Africa Games (1978 and 1987) he represented his native East African country at three consecutive Summer Olympics, starting in Moscow, Soviet Union (1980). There he set his best Olympic result by finishing in 12th place in the overall-rankings.

At the Lite Summer Games held at the Duke University Campus in Durham (North Carolina, USA), on June 27, 1982, Arop threw the javelin to a winning personal best of 84.58 meters (old design). He currently holds the Ugandan record with 75.52 m (new design).

International competitions

Seasonal bests by year
1987 - 71.76
1988 - 75.72

References 

1958 births
1994 deaths
Ugandan javelin throwers
Male javelin throwers
Ugandan male athletes
Olympic athletes of Uganda
Athletes (track and field) at the 1980 Summer Olympics
Athletes (track and field) at the 1984 Summer Olympics
Athletes (track and field) at the 1988 Summer Olympics
Commonwealth Games competitors for Uganda
Athletes (track and field) at the 1982 Commonwealth Games
Athletes (track and field) at the 1990 Commonwealth Games
World Athletics Championships athletes for Uganda
African Games gold medalists for Uganda
African Games medalists in athletics (track and field)
Athletes (track and field) at the 1978 All-Africa Games
Athletes (track and field) at the 1987 All-Africa Games